Variety is the sixth studio album by Japanese singer-songwriter Mariya Takeuchi. It was released on 25 April 1984 through Moon Records. Variety is considered as Takeuchi's "comeback" album after being on hiatus since 1981, and is the first album entirely written by her. The album is produced by Takeuchi's husband, Tatsuro Yamashita.

To international audiences, Variety is known for containing "Plastic Love" which, although only seeing moderate success in Japan when it was released as a single in 1985, saw a resurgence in popularity internationally in 2017 after a remix was uploaded to YouTube.

Production and release 
Takeuchi's five albums released before Variety were mostly written by other songwriters which, although they featured industry stars such as Haruomi Hosono and members of Toto, left her feeling "exhausted". She went on hiatus at the end of 1981 due to a sore throat, as well as to marry Yamashita in 1982.

During her break, Yamashita left his record label, RCA Records, for the newly-founded Moon Records. Meanwhile, Takeuchi began writing some of the songs which would be included in Variety. Yamashita originally planned for Takeuchi's comeback album to be written by other songwriters, but changed his mind after listening to some of Takeuchi's work. A promotional single, "Mou Ichido", was released on 10 April 1984, followed by a full release on 25 April. The album topped the Oricon Albums Chart.

A 30th Anniversary edition of the album was released on 19 November 2014. The version included a previously unreleased track, both club remixes from the single release of "Plastic Love", and karaoke versions of four tracks.

The 30th Anniversary edition of the album became available on music streaming services like Apple Music and Spotify on 3 November 2021, the same date when the 2021 vinyl reissue was released.

Track listing

Charts

References 

1984 albums
Japanese-language albums